Georges Henein (1914–1973) was an Egyptian poet and author. He was a founding member of the Cairo-based, surrealist Art and Liberty Group which brought together artists, writers and various intellectuals of different backgrounds and national origins under the shared cause of anti-fascist activism. The group was active from 1938 up until the late 1940s.

Early life and education
Born in Cairo in 1914, Henien was the son of Sadek Henein Pacha, a coptic diplomat father and Mary Zanelli, an Italian-Egyptian mother. Henein spent his childhood between Cairo, Madrid, Rome and Paris where he would eventually study at the Lycée Pasteur de Neuily and the Sorbonne. Because of his education abroad, he was fluent in Arabic, Italian, Greek, English and French. While in France, Henein met André Breton and Henri Calet. He established a friendship with Breton and began a correspondence with him in which Henein "grappled with questions of how to fuse revolutionary Marxism with Surrealism."

Before graduating from the Sorbonne, Henein joined Les Essayistes ("The Attempters"), a Francophone literary club, and took part in its monthly publication Un Effort. In 1933 he became a columnist in Egyptian newspapers, notable for his enlightening or nasty tone.

Writing career 
Back from Paris in the 1930s, he spread surrealism in Cairo by founding the group Art et Liberté (Albert Cossery was a member), and then by creating the journal (and publishing house) La Part du Sable with poet Edmond Jabès and painter Ramsès Younane. In 1938, Georges met surrealist poet, Ikbal El-Alailly, also known as Paula, who he would marry in 1954. Together, along with several other surrealists from Art and Liberty, they worked on a surrealist publication of writings and drawings titled La séance continue. When he died, she published several of his works in French such as Notes on a Useless Country, The Gloomiest Relation, and the Savage Spirit. In 1939 he cofounded a weekly, Don Quichotte, together with Henri Curiel and Raoul Curiel. Henein participated in the journal Troisième Convoi (1945–1951), created by his friend Michel Fardoulis-Lagrange and Jean Maquet. 

In 1938, he published his first collection of poems titled Absurdity of Being with illustrations by fellow Art and Liberty member Kamel el-Telmissany. In 1944-45, he published For a Polluted Consciousness, Who Are You, Mr. Aragon and Position of Terror. His later titles include The Incompatible, Two Images, Allusion to Kafka, and The Forbidden. In 1967, he wrote the introduction for An Anthology of Contemporary Arabic Literature and in 1969 he worked as a collaborator in The Small Political Encyclopedia.

In Paris, he co-directed the surrealist liaison office “Cause”, but in 1948, he withdrew from the Surrealist movement, while still publishing his poems in Phases journal. In the 1960s, he got involved in journalism working as editor-in-chief and head of the reporting department for the news magazines Jeune Afrique and L’Express.

While forced to exile in France by the Egyptian government in 1962 – due to his anti-fascist ideas, Henein worked as a journalist. Writing on Louis-Ferdinand Céline, Marilyn Monroe or Françoise Hardy, Henein stood out for his free, alert and unalterable tone. He used to work with an urgency allowing him to be scandalized or to be moved in the same breath, with a rage sometimes tinged with melancholy, sometimes with perfidy. An example: “Raymond Roussel snubbed Marcel Proust, and, for that alone, he deserves our sympathy.” (Guliver, Paris, 1973)

References

Bibliography 

 Déraisons d'être, José Corti, Paris, 1938
 Un temps de petite fille, Editions de Minuit, Paris, 1947
 L'Incompatible, La Part du sable, Paris, 1949
Le Seuil interdit, Mercure de France, Paris, 1956
Le Signe le plus obscur, Présence, Paris, 1977
La Force de saluer, La Différence, Paris, 1978
 L'Esprit frappeur: carnets 1940–1973, Encre, 1980
Œuvres. Poésies, récits, essais et articles, forewords by Yves Bonnefoy and Berto Fahri, Denoël, Paris, 2006

External links
 Egyptian Surrealism 
 The Prestige of Terror - translated from the french by Tom Ridgway
 Long Live Degenerate Art manifesto
 Ramsès Younan

1914 births
1973 deaths
20th-century Egyptian writers
Anti-fascists
Egyptian poets
Egyptian expatriates in France